Ramiro Larrea (died 1 July 2020) was an Ecuadorian politician.

Biography 
From 1972 till 1977 he served as Minister of Agriculture and later served as a Justice on the Supreme Court of Justice from 1987 till 1998.

Larrea died in Guayaquil at the age of 87, due to respiratory complications from the COVID-19 disease.

References

1937 births
2020 deaths
Ecuadorian judges
Government ministers of Ecuador
Deaths from the COVID-19 pandemic in Ecuador